La Playa may refer to:

 La Playa de Belén, a municipality in the department of North Santander, Colombia
 La Playa (de Ponce), a barrio in Ponce, Puerto Rico
 La Playa, San Diego, a bayfront neighborhood in Point Loma, San Diego, California, U.S.
 La Playa Trail, a historic route in San Diego, California, U.S.
 La Playa DC, a 2012 Colombian film directed by Juan Andrés Arango
 "La Playa", a song by La Oreja de Van Gogh from the 2000 album El viaje de Copperpot
 "La Playa", a song by Ivy Queen from the 2012 album Musa
 La Playa, a Medellín Metro station
 La Playa Hotel, a hotel in Carmel-by-the-Sea, California

See also 
 Playa (disambiguation)